Mound City is a city in and the county seat of Linn County, Kansas, United States.  As of the 2020 census, the population of the city was 647.

History
Mound City was founded in 1855. It was named from Sugar Mound nearby, a hill covered with sugar maple trees.

During the Civil War, a military post was established at Mound City. On October 25, 1864, Mound City was attacked twice by Confederates retreating south after their defeat at the Battle of Westport.  The military post was closed and abandoned in June 1865 after the end of the war.

Geography
Mound City is located at  (38.142026, -94.812186).

Climate
The climate in this area is characterized by hot, humid summers and generally mild to cool winters.  According to the Köppen Climate Classification system, Mound City has a humid subtropical climate, abbreviated "Cfa" on climate maps.

Demographics

2010 census
As of the census of 2010, there were 694 people, 297 households, and 177 families residing in the city. The racial makeup of the city was 95.8% White, 1.0% African American, 0.6% Native American, 1.0% from other races, and 1.6% from two or more races. Hispanic or Latino of any race were 1.7% of the population.

There were 297 households, of which 26.6% had children under the age of 18 living with them, 49.8% were married couples living together, 5.4% had a female householder with no husband present, 4.4% had a male householder with no wife present, and 40.4% were non-families. 36.7% of all households were made up of individuals, and 18.5% had someone living alone who was 65 years of age or older. The average household size was 2.24 and the average family size was 2.93.

The median age in the city was 40.6 years. 22.8% of residents were under the age of 18; 8.4% were between the ages of 18 and 24; 23.5% were from 25 to 44; 25.1% were from 45 to 64; and 19.9% were 65 years of age or older. The gender makeup of the city was 47.7% male and 52.3% female.

2000 census
As of the census of 2000, there were 821 people, 331 households, and 219 families residing in the city. The racial makeup of the city was 97.20% White, 1.46% African American, 0.12% Native American, 0.24% Pacific Islander, and 0.97% from two or more races. Hispanic or Latino of any race were 0.85% of the population.

There were 331 households, out of which 28.4% had children under the age of 18 living with them, 54.1% were married couples living together, 10.9% had a female householder with no husband present, and 33.8% were non-families. 31.4% of all households were made up of individuals, and 18.4% had someone living alone who was 65 years of age or older. The average household size was 2.33 and the average family size was 2.93.

In the city, the population was spread out, with 25.8% under the age of 18, 6.5% from 18 to 24, 23.8% from 25 to 44, 21.4% from 45 to 64, and 22.5% who were 65 years of age or older. The median age was 40 years. For every 100 females, there were 85.7 males. For every 100 females age 18 and over, there were 81.3 males.

The median income for a household in the city was $30,795, and the median income for a family was $39,265. Males had a median income of $26,500 versus $23,203 for females. The per capita income for the city was $14,407. About 7.5% of families and 10.3% of the population were below the poverty line, including 10.7% of those under age 18 and 15.4% of those age 65 or over.

Education
Mound City is served by Jayhawk USD 346. The district high school is Jayhawk-Linn High School.

Prior to school unification, the Mound City High School mascot was Eagles.

References

Further reading

External links
 City of Mound City
 Mound City - Directory of Public Officials
 USD 346, local school district
 Mound city map, KDOT

Cities in Kansas
County seats in Kansas
Cities in Linn County, Kansas
Populated places established in 1855
1855 establishments in Kansas Territory